Trapezium may refer to:

Geometry
Outside the US and Canada, a quadrilateral with at least one pair of parallel sides (known in the US as a trapezoid)
In the US and Canada, a quadrilateral with no parallel sides (known elsewhere as a general irregular quadrilateral)

Other uses
Trapezium (bone), a bone in the wrist
Trapezium (astronomy), a group of stars in the Orion Nebula

See also
Trapezius, a muscle